Guangning Subdistrict is a subdistrict that makes up the northwestern corner of Shijingshan District, Beijing, China. It borders Wulituo Subdistrict to the north, Jinding Street Subdistrict to the east, Gucheng Subdistrict to the south, and Mentougou District to the west. As of 2020, it had a total of 14,684 inhabitants.

The name Guangning comes from Count of Guangning of the Ming dynasty, who was buried here after his death.

History

Administrative Division 
In 2021, Guangning Subdistrict was administreatively divided into 5 communities, which were listed in the table below:

See also 
 List of township-level divisions of Beijing

References 

Shijingshan District
Subdistricts of Beijing